Lars Joseph Ceesay (born 3 June 1998) is a Swedish professional footballer who plays as a midfielder for Allsvenskan club Malmö FF.

Club career 
Ceesay began to play football in Hässelby SK. In 2008 he moved to Brommapojkarna, well known for their youth academy. In the summer of 2013, Ceesay moved to another club in the Stockholm region, Djurgårdens. In November 2016 he signed his first A-team deal with Djurgården; a 3.5-years contract. During spring 2017, he was loaned out to Vasalunds and scored a goal in May 2017 against Enskede.

In July 2017 Ceesay was loaned out to Frej for the rest of the 2017 season. In December, the loan was extended until the end of 2018. He was called back to Djurgården in July 2018, only to be sent on loan to Brage a month later. In January 2019 he was again loaned, this time to Dalkurd, for the 2019 season.

On 29 November 2019, Ceesay signed with Helsingborgs IF on a two-year deal.

On 11 July 2022,  Joseph Ceesay signed with Malmö FF. He will wear jersey number 15.

International career 
Born in Sweden, Ceesay is of Gambian descent. On 5 October 2020, he was called up to the Sweden U21 national team training camp in Olympia, Helsingborg. He did not appear in scheduled UEFA Euro U-21 qualifying games against Luxembourg and Armenia.

Personal life
His younger brother Jesper Ceesay plays for AIK.

References

1998 births
Living people
Swedish footballers
Sweden youth international footballers
Swedish people of Gambian descent
Association football midfielders
Djurgårdens IF Fotboll players
Vasalunds IF players
IK Frej players
IK Brage players
Dalkurd FF players
Helsingborgs IF players
Lechia Gdańsk players
Ettan Fotboll players
Superettan players
Allsvenskan players
Ekstraklasa players
Expatriate footballers in Poland